Tailing is a defect in printing consisting of a rapid change of optical density when printing solid graphics. The failure results when the optical density of the employed toner reaches the highest value it can provide, when a perfect line of change is visualized in the printed graphic and a substantial reduction of said density follows.

The changes are in most cases caused by small toner particles in the surface of the OPC not fully charged and unable to transfer to the paper. Such partially untransferred particles of toner end up being collected by the cartridge cleaning system and sent to the waste bin. Such errors are associated with the quality of the developing system including OPC and/or Magnetic/Developer Roller.

In addition, the lack of homogeneity and charge acceptance due to the variation in toner particle size can contribute to increased tailing.

Laser image generation